Vivaldi’s Cello is an album by Yo-Yo Ma and the Amsterdam Baroque Orchestra with Ton Koopman as conductor, released in 2004 on Sony Classical Records. It contains various arrangements taken from Antonio Vivaldi's operas and oratorios.

Track listing

Personnel
 Yo-Yo Ma - cello

The Amsterdam Baroque Orchestra
 Ton Koopman - conductor, harpsichord, organ
 Margaret Faultless - violin
 Foskien Kooistra - violin
 Catherine Martin - violin
 Fanny Pestalozzi - violin
 David Rabinovich - violin
 Alida Schat - violin
 Carla Marotta - violin
 Silvia Schweinberger - violin
 Ruth Slater - violin
 Katherine McGillivray - viola
 Jane Rogers - viola
 Jonathan Manson - cello
 Catherine Jones - cello
 Alberto Rasi - double bass
 Alfredo Bernardini - oboe
 Michel Henry - oboe
 Woulter Verschuren - bassoon
 Mike Fentross - lute

Production
Producer: Tini Mathot
Arrangement: Ton Koopman
Engineers: Adriaan Versteijnen
Photography: Stephen Danelian

Charts
Album

References

External links

2004 classical albums
Sony Classical Records albums
Yo-Yo Ma albums